Charles Robin de Bohun Devereux, 19th Viscount Hereford (born 11 August 1975), is the premier viscount in the Peerage of England.

Education

Devereux was educated at Stowe School and at the University of East Anglia where he graduated in 1998 with a BA degree in History of Art and Architecture.

Career
Devereux joined Bonhams Auctioneers upon graduation in 1998, has been the director of valuations since 2007, and the UK Board Director since 2010.  In 2017 Viscount Hereford was appointed Director of Private Clients for Bonhams.

Family
Upon the death in 2004 of his father, the 18th Viscount Hereford, he succeeded to the family titles as Viscount Hereford and 16th baronet.

Hereford married Louisa Knight, a textile designer, on 12 June 2010. They had issue: 

 Sophia Emily Florence Devereux (b. 12 January 2013) 
 Henry Walter de Bohun Devereux (11 February 2015), heir apparent. 

He is a member of White's.

Arms

See also 
 Count of Évreux

References

Notes
 Who's Who 2016

External links 
 www.burkespeerage.com
 www.thepeerage.com

1975 births
Living people
People from Warwickshire
People from London
Robin
People educated at Stowe School
Alumni of the University of East Anglia